Rubén Benjamín Félix Hays (born 15 March 1964) is a Mexican politician affiliated with the PANAL. As of 2013 he served as Deputy of both the LVIII and LXII Legislatures of the Mexican Congress representing Sinaloa.

References

1964 births
Living people
Politicians from Sinaloa
New Alliance Party (Mexico) politicians
21st-century Mexican politicians
People from Los Mochis
Monterrey Institute of Technology and Higher Education alumni
Deputies of the LXII Legislature of Mexico
Members of the Chamber of Deputies (Mexico) for Sinaloa